The Broadway Cemetery Historic District covers an area of 15.27 acres, a six-block collective of seven separate cemeteries in the city of Galveston, Texas. The architectural styles displayed in these cemeteries run a gamut of categories: late 19th and early 20th Century Revivals: Beaux Arts, Colonial Revival, Classical Revival, Italian Renaissance and Late Gothic Revival. It has been listed on the National Register of Historic Places since 2014.

History 
Galveston, Texas was hit hard with nine yellow fever epidemics during the period 1839 through 1867, necessitating additional public burial sites. At the time, it was the largest city in Texas, and was the seaport of entry for the state. It is estimated that in 1853, 60 percent of its population was affected by the yellow fever crisis, with a death toll of 523. The island's last yellow fever epidemic in 1867 killed hundreds. With the onset of that health crisis, thousands fled the island. One resident who stayed behind remembered that the victims "died on the island like sheep.”

Old City Cemetery (1839) 
This was the first cemetery established as part of the original town charter in 1839. Its history is the source of rumors and folklore. It is alleged to be haunted by Thomas Nicaragua Smith, executed as a deserter from the Confederate Army during the American Civil War. The remains  of Elize Alberti and her family also come with a legend. She is alleged to have murdered her own children.

Oleander Cemetery (1839) 
Established in 1839 as Potter's Field cemetery, it was originally for unclaimed or indigent people. During the Franklin D. Roosevelt New Deal Works Progress Administration (WPA) agenda, a Galveston city ordinance renamed it Oleander Cemetery in 1939. During this period, the cemetery was reconfigured.

Evergreen Cemetery (1839) 
Estimated 900 interments, the majority interred 1839–1964.

The Old Catholic Cemetery (c. 1844) 
Established by the Archdiocese of Galveston-Houston.

Episcopal Cemetery (1844) 
This was created in 1844 on land deeded to the Rector of the Episcopal Church. A brick wall and concrete walks were added later. There are estimated to be over 1,000 interments.

Hebrew Benevolent Society Cemetery (1868) 
More than 500 interments. Isadore Dyer donated a plot of land in 1852, for use by the Jewish Cemetery Association. The first individual burial plots were acquired in 1867 and 1897.

The New City Cemetery (1900) 
Established in response to the 1900 Galveston hurricane that claimed thousands of lives.

See also
 List of cemeteries in Texas
 National Register of Historic Places listings in Galveston County, Texas
 Recorded Texas Historic Landmarks in Galveston County

References

Additional sourcing
 
 
 
 
 
 
 
 
 
 
 
 

Cemeteries in Galveston County, Texas
Cemeteries on the National Register of Historic Places in Texas
Cemeteries in Texas
Historic districts on the National Register of Historic Places in Texas